D-Chowk, also referred to as Democracy Chowk, is a large town square located on the junction of Jinnah Avenue and Constitution Avenue in Islamabad. It is located in the government district, close to several important government buildings: the Presidency, the Prime Minister’s office, the Parliament, and the Supreme Court.

The square is a frequent venue for political rallies and other public gatherings, and has been likened to Egypt's Tahrir Square. Since the square is a junction on two major roads, such meetings have repeatedly paralyzed traffic in Islamabad. In April 2016, the government decreed that the square should be rebuilt to make it a no-go area for protesters. However, political rallies continue to be held there.

References

Roads in Islamabad
Roads in Islamabad Capital Territory